This is a list of suburbs in the City of Cape Town , South Africa which includes the city of Cape Town and its surrounding suburbs and exurbs

Each suburb is followed by its postcode. The first code is for street deliveries, the second, where applicable, refers to PO boxes. Some suburbs share the same postcode.

In South Africa, the term "suburb" does not necessarily mean "residential area on the edge of a city"; rather, it is used synonymously with neighbourhood to refer to the smallest geographical subdivision of the city.

Atlantic Seaboard

Cape Flats (South East suburbs)

City Bowl

Eastern Suburbs

Northern Suburbs

Southern Suburbs

West Coast Suburbs

References

 
Cape Town suburbs
Suburbs